The Eurovision Song Contest 1963 was the eighth edition of the annual Eurovision Song Contest and took place in London, United Kingdom. The contest was held at the BBC Television Centre on Saturday 23 March 1963 and was hosted by Katie Boyle for a second time.

Sixteen countries participated in the contest, the same countries that had participated the previous year.

This was the first victory for any of the Nordic countries.

Location 

The host venue was the BBC Television Centre, White City, London, which opened in 1960. It is one of the most readily recognisable facilities of its type having appeared as the backdrop for many BBC programmes. It remained to be one of the largest such facilities in the world until it redeveloped in March 2013.

Format 
Two studios (TC3 and TC4) were used: one for the mistress of ceremonies Katie Boyle, the audience, and the scoreboard (TC3); the other for the performers and the orchestra accompanying them (TC4). Unusually, a boom microphone (normally used for drama and comedy shows) was employedthe viewer could not see this, so it appeared as if the artists were miming to their vocals. This was not the case, but this innovation was to create a new look for the contest.

Voting controversy
One controversy this year was during the voting. When it was 's turn to announce their votes, the spokesman in Oslo, Roald Øyen, did not use the correct procedure in that the song number, followed by the name of the country, should have been announced before awarding the points. Boyle asked Norway to repeat their results, but the Norwegian spokesman asked Boyle to return to them after all the other results were in. When Boyle went back to Norway again the votes had mysteriously altered, thus changing the outcome of the contest and giving the victory to Norway's neighbours  at 's expense. In fact, the Norwegian spokesman had not given the correct votes on the first occasion, because votes from the 20 jury members were still being tallied.

Monaco was also asked to repeat their voting a second time as initially Monaco gave one point to both the United Kingdom and Luxembourg. However, when Boyle went back to Monaco to receive the votes again Monaco's one vote to Luxembourg was efficiently discarded (although this did not have any effect on the positions of the countries).

It has also been speculated as to whether the juries were indeed on the end of a telephone line or in the actual studio given how clearly their voices could be heard as opposed to sounding as though they were being redirected through a telephone line.

Participating countries 

All countries which participated in the  edition also participated in the 1963 edition.

Conductors 
The participating conductors were:

 Eric Robinson
 Eric Robinson
 Willy Berking
 Erwin Halletz
 Øivind Bergh
 
 George de Godzinsky
 Kai Mortensen
 Miljenko Prohaska
 Eric Robinson
 Franck Pourcel
 
 
 Francis Bay
 Raymond Lefèvre
 Eric Robinson

Returning artists

Participants and results

Detailed voting results 

Each country had 20 jury members who awarded their five favourite songs 5, 4, 3, 2, and 1 points in order. All those points would then be added up and the five song with the most points got 5, 4, 3, 2, and 1 votes in order. Errors in the Norwegian (see above) and the Monegasque votes meant their scores had to be announced twice, with an adjustment to the scores being made in each case before the final score was verified.

5 points 
Below is a summary of all 5 points received:

Spokespersons 

Listed below is the order in which votes were cast during the 1963 contest along with the spokesperson who was responsible for announcing the votes for their respective country.

 Pete Murray
 Pim Jacobs
 Werner Veigel
 Emil Kollpacher
 Roald Øyen
 Enzo Tortora
 
 TBC
 
 
 Armand Lanoux
 Julio Rico
 
 Ward Bogaert
 TBC
 TBC

Broadcasts 

Each participating broadcaster was required to relay the contest via its networks. Non-participating EBU member broadcasters were also able to relay the contest as "passive participants". Broadcasters were able to send commentators to provide coverage of the contest in their own native language and to relay information about the artists and songs to their television viewers.

Known details on the broadcasts in each country, including the specific broadcasting stations and commentators are shown in the tables below.

Notes

References

External links

 

 
1963
Music festivals in the United Kingdom
1963 in music
1963 in the United Kingdom
1963 in London
March 1963 events in the United Kingdom
Events in London